Jane Hilda Charlotta Gylling (6 April 1902 – 10 March 1961) was a Swedish freestyle swimmer who competed at the 1920 and 1924 Summer Olympics. In 1920 she won a bronze medal in the 4 × 100 m freestyle relay and finished sixth in the individual 100 m and 300 m events. In 1924 she was eliminated in the preliminaries of the 400 m freestyle race.

References

Further reading 
 

1902 births
1961 deaths
Sportspeople from Gotland County
Olympic swimmers of Sweden
Swimmers at the 1920 Summer Olympics
Swimmers at the 1924 Summer Olympics
Olympic bronze medalists for Sweden
Olympic bronze medalists in swimming
Swedish female freestyle swimmers
SK Najaden swimmers
Medalists at the 1920 Summer Olympics
20th-century Swedish women